Bos is a river of Saarland, Germany. It is a left tributary of the Nahe, which it joins in Gonnesweiler.

Geography 
From here, the stream flows predominantly to the east. Just before the reservoir it is joined by the right tributary Pärwiesbach which reaches it after flowing through Bosen. The outlet of the Bostalsee is located southwest of Gonnesweiler. South of the Bostalsee the Dämelbach flows into the Bos.

On its  course, the Bos drops , which corresponds to a mean bottom slope of 1.91%. It drains a  drainage basin.

Tributaries 
 Jordanbach (right)
 Dumpfbach (right)
 Seifenbach (left)
 Letschbruchbach (left)
 Steinfloß (left)
 Parwiesbach (right)
 Altertbach (left)
 Sandbach (left)
 Trieschwiesbach (right)
 Dämelbach (right)
 Krämersbach (right)

See also
List of rivers of Saarland

Rivers of Saarland
Rivers of Germany